The Centre de stockage de la Manche (CSM)(Manche storage center) is the oldest French radioactive waste storage center. It is located in the commune of La Hague, bordering on the La Hague site. The CSM was created in 1969 and then received nuclear waste until it reached saturation in 1994. According to :fr:Agence nationale pour la gestion des déchets radioactifs (ANDRA)'s inventory, the waste stored includes approximately 1,469,265 packages, corresponding to 527,225 m³, mainly from nuclear power generation (nuclear power plants and facilities corresponding to nuclear fuel cycle front end and back end).

Hurd's Deep, which is heavily polluted, is located in the vicinity.

History 
In 1967, the French Alternative Energies and Atomic Energy Commission created Infratome, a private company which was a subsidiary of the :fr:Mines de potasse d'Alsace. After considering the Biville dunes, owned by the army, the decision was made to build the CSM to the east of the La Hague reprocessing plant, in a wetland area called the "Haut Marais". Today, a wetland would never be chosen to house a storage center.

The local elected officials did not want the CSM to be managed by a private operator. As a consequence, the  Atomic Energy Commission  controlled the storage facilities until 1991, when the :fr:Agence nationale pour la gestion des déchets radioactifs (ANDRA: National Agency for Radioactive Waste Management), which had been an entity of the Atomic Energy Commission since 1979, took over the center as an independent public institution (created by the law of 30 December 1991).

The first waste received in 1969 was hospital waste, in particular radium used for cancer treatment. Storage consisted at the beginning in ordinary trenches, in the ground. Then the safer and easier storage on the surface is adopted: Concrete blocks are poured around the casks, then covered with a plastic film and earth. The result of storage on the surface is called a "tumulus".

In 1976, an accident occurred that caused tritium pollution of the aquifer and water on the surface. For several years, plutonium, radium, thorium, and waste containing tritium from the all of the French nuclear power plants had been stored in 6 vaults in a structure called TB2. The leaks would be due to an overflow at the surface of the deep drainage network on the grounds of heavy rainfalls and malfunctions of the lifting pump.

In 1984, storage structures were restored ( trenches in the ground and concrete-walled trenches) and packages were taken back and reconditioned, improving their containment.

In 1991, the construction of the center's roof began. It is intended to protect the packages from water infiltration.

In 1994, the last package was received, then the storage was closed by the ANDRA in order to prepare the transition into the monitoring phase (planned for a period of around 300 years).

In 2003, a decree authorized the center to enter the transition into the monitoring phase.

Remarks 
In 1996, two official reports showed that the site safety studies were positive. The government's evaluation commission also considers that the site cannot be restored to its initial state even after 300 years (in French site non banalisable), and that it is necessary to keep its memory.

According to the Sortir du nucléaire (France), the site's management would be poor:
"some defective canister sometimes directly in the ground should be reconditioned, but the project was stopped because of its cost and of the risk to workers; casks are protected from rain by a waterproof cover that is already beginning to crack; the embankments are sagging; rivers that flow from the site are subject to pollution".

In 2006, Sortir du nucléaire also claims that it contains more than 100 kg of disseminated plutonium, 200 tonnes of uranium, chemicals and heavy metals.

In 2013, a study carried out by :fr:Association pour le contrôle de la radioactivité dans l'Ouest, based in Caen, and financed by the Manche departmental council and the Autorité de sûreté nucléaire showed that data from ANDRA were underestimated. According to this association, actinides are found in the bed of :fr:Ruisseau de Sainte-Hélène

References 

 

Radioactive waste repositories
Buildings and structures completed in 1969
1969 establishments in France
Nuclear technology in France
Manche